Pierre Bergounioux (born 1949 in Brive-la-Gaillarde, Corrèze) is a French writer. He won the 1986 Prix Alain-Fournier for his second novel, Ce pas et le suivant. And in 2002, he won the SGDL literary grand prize for his body of work.

Works
 Catherine, Gallimard (1984)
 Ce pas et le suivant, Gallimard (1985)
 La bête faramineuse, Gallimard (1986)
 La maison rose, Gallimard (1987)
 L'arbre sur la rivière, Gallimard (1988)
 C'était nous, Gallimard (1989)
 Johan Zoffany, Vénus sur les eaux, with Bernadette de Boysson, éditions William Blake & Co. (1990)
 La mue, Gallimard (1991)
 L'orphelin, Gallimard (1992)
 Le matin des origines, Verdier (1992)
 Le Grand Sylvain, Verdier (1993)
 La Toussaint, Gallimard (1994)
 La casse, Fata Morgana (1994)
 Points cardinaux, Fata Morgana (1994)
 L'immémorable, with Magdi Senadji, éditions À une soie (1994)
 Au jour consumé, with Jean-Michel Fauquet, éditions Filigranes (1994)
 Miette, Gallimard (1995) ; Folio (1996)
 La cécité d'Homère. Cinq leçons de poétique, éditions Circé (1995)
 D'abord, nous sommes au monde, with Alain Turpault, éditions du Laquet (1995)
 Æneis, avec Philippe Ségéral, Fondation Paribas (1995)
 La mort de Brune, Gallimard (1996) et Folio (1997)
 Le chevron, Verdier (1996)
 Haute tension, éditions William Blake & Co. (1996)
 Le bois du chapitre, éditions Théodore Balmoral (1996)
 Les choses mêmes, with François Pons, éditions Les Cahiers de l'Atelier (1996)
 La ligne, Verdier (1997)
 L'empreinte, éditions François Janaud (1997) ; Fata Morgana (2007)
 La demeure des ombres, éditions Art & Arts (1997)
 Kpélié, Les Flohic éditeurs (1997)
 Conversations sur l'Isle, interviews with Tristan Hordé, éditions William Blake & Co. (1998)
 La puissance du souvenir dans l'écriture. L'effet Zeigarnik, éditions Pleins Feux (2000)
 Le premier mot, Gallimard (2001)
 Les forges de Syam, éditions de l'Imprimeur (2001) ; Verdier poche (2007)
 Simples, magistraux et autres antidotes, Verdier (2001)
 Un peu de bleu dans le paysage, Verdier (2001)
 B-17 G, Les Flohic éditeurs (2001), Argol (2006)
 François, éditions François Janaud (2001)
 Jusqu'à Faulkner, Gallimard (2002)
 Aimer la grammaire, Nathan (2002)
 L'héritage, interviews with Gabriel Bergounioux, Les Flohic éditeurs (2002)
 Ordalies, with Jean-Michel Fauquet, éditions Filigranes (2002)
 Back in the sixties, Verdier (2003)
 Univers préférables, Fata Morgana (2003)
 Bréviaire de littérature à l'usage des vivants, Bréal (2004)
 Le fleuve des âges, Fata Morgana (2005)
 Pycniques et leptosomes. Sur C.-A. Cingria, Fata Morgana (2005)
 Carnet de notes. Journal 1980-1990, Verdier (2006)
 L'invention du présent, Fata Morgana (2006)
 La fin du monde en avançant, Fata Morgana (2006)
 École : mission accomplie, éditions les Prairies ordinaires (2006)
 Où est le passé, interview with Michel Gribinski, Éditions de l'Olivier(2007)
 Carnet de notes. Journal 1991-2000, Verdier (2007)

English translations of Pierre Bergounioux: 

Three of his novellas have been translated by Claude Neuman: The Line (La ligne – Verdier, 1997), Would-Be Hunter (Chasseur à la manque - Gallimard, 2010) and Childishnesses (Enfantillages – L’Herne, 2019). These translations have been published in 2022 under the collective title Of Fish and Game and Butterflies by Editions www.ressouvenances.fr. ISBN 978-2-84505-289-5

External links
 Pierre Bergounioux at publisher's site (in French)
 Pierre Bergounioux at remue.net (in French)
 Documentation about Pierre Bergounioux's body of work (in French)

1949 births
Living people
People from Brive-la-Gaillarde
ENS Fontenay-Saint-Cloud-Lyon alumni
20th-century French writers
20th-century French male writers
21st-century French writers
French diarists
Prix Roger Caillois recipients
Prix France Culture winners
Prix Alain-Fournier winners